Carrick High School is a public school in the Carrick neighborhood of Pittsburgh.

Carrick is one of ten high schools in the Pittsburgh Public Schools, and one of the few to offer Business Technology and Health Technology programs.

Feeder district
The City of Pittsburgh neighborhoods which are served by Carrick High School are Allentown, Arlington, Arlington Heights, Beltzhoover, Bon Air, Brookline, Carrick, Knoxville, Overbrook, Mt. Oliver (Pittsburgh Section), Southside Slopes and St. Clair.

Business Technology program
The Business Technology program has three levels, the first being an Introduction to Entrepreneurship which lasts one year. Students explore business careers and success strategies while learning computer programs such as Microsoft Word, Powerpoint and Publisher. Level Two consists of a year of accounting, followed by half a year of Excel Spreadsheets and half a year of Access Database. The third level provides two options; students can either choose to take a year of Accounting II, or half a year of Web Design and half a year of Business Law.

Health Technology program
The program was established in 1988, and prepares students for a career in the medical field.  The program is divided into three levels, the first being Health Technology I. During this time, students become aware of medical terms and definitions and take part in community service projects and field trips. Health Technology II involves a youth internship program with UPMC hospitals, as well as the exploration of areas such as anesthesiology, emergency medicine, gerontology, nursing and occupational therapy.  The final stage, Health Technology III, links together the high school and the Community College of Allegheny County, offering students the opportunity to enroll and gain credits in at least one college-level course.

Theater
Carrick is one of the few city schools to have a theater program, It was a contestant in the 2007 Gene Kelly Awards for a production of Crazy For You.

Plays

 2005: A Midsummer Night's Dream
 2006: Dracula
 2007: Arsenic and Old Lace
 2008: Memory Night: A Night of One Act Comedies
 2009: The House of Blue Leaves
 2010: A Wilde Night of Edgar Allan Poe
 2011: The Complete Works of William Shakespeare (abridged)

Musicals

 2001: Kickin' Butts and Taking Names
 2003: Pippin
 2004: The Wizard of Oz
 2005: The Music Man
 2006: Guys and Dolls
 2007: Crazy For You
 2008: A Funny Thing Happened on the Way to the Forum
 2009: Company
 2010: Smokey Joe's Cafe
 2011: 13

Notable alumni

 Tom Atkins, class of 1956
 Jimmy Beaumont, vocalist for The Skyliners doo-wop group, class of 1957
 Janet Vogel, vocalist for The Skyliners doo-wop group 
 Michael Dawida, class of 1967
 Phyllis Hyman, class of 1968
 Jack Johnson, NFL player, class of 1952
 Tom Modrak, class of 1960
 Ted Schmitt, NFL player
 Joe Verscharen, vocalist for The Skyliners doo-wop group, class of 1957
 Milan Vooletich, class of 1960
 John Wehner, class of 1986

References

External links
 Carrick High School
 Pittsburgh Public Schools

High schools in Pittsburgh
Public high schools in Pennsylvania